The Conference of Presidents of Major American Jewish Organizations (CoP; commonly Presidents' Conference) is an American non-profit organization that addresses issues of critical concern to the Jewish community, and the state of Israel in particular. It comprises 51 national Jewish organizations. It was founded to develop a consensus voice among Jewish organizations in dealings with the executive branch. 

On August 4, 2019, Jewish News Syndicate reported that William Daroff will replace Malcolm Hoenlein as the CEO of the Conference of Presidents of Major American Jewish Organizations.

History
The Conference of Presidents of Major Jewish Organizations was founded in 1956 in response to requests from President Dwight D. Eisenhower and his administration. The American Jewish community of the period was experiencing a large growth in its similar policy groups (such as the American Jewish Committee and American Jewish Congress) and the increasing influence of the Jewish denominations on politics (particularly from Orthodox and Conservative Jews). The Eisenhower administration wanted a way to gauge the opinion of the community, without wading into the internal politics of the community, and polling leaders of each organization. The conference established a unified voice for the community, one that government officials could consult on important matters.

For its first 30 years, the organization was headed by Yehuda Hellman. After his death in 1986, Malcolm Hoenlein became chairman.  Hoenlein took a much stronger role in shaping US policy, especially within the executive branch.

Activities

The conference's website states that it is "the preeminent forum where diverse segments of the Jewish community come together in mutual respect to deliberate vital national and international issues."

Among the listed priorities of the conference are to:

International Leadership Award
In December 2008, the conference presented Canadian Prime Minister Stephen Harper, and his government as a whole, with its inaugural "International Leadership Award" for his support for Israel. Malcolm Hoenlein, the executive vice-chairman of the conference, stated that the award was given to express the group's appreciation for Canada's "courageous stands" to boycott the Durban II anti-racism conference. He also praised Canada's "support for Israel and [its] efforts at the U.N. against incitement and ... the delegitimization [of Israel], where they have taken a role in the forefront."

Support for Jonathan Pollard
In December 2008, the conference asked President George W. Bush to pardon Jonathan Pollard, a former US navy analyst who was sentenced to life in prison in 1987 for spying for Israel. Malcolm Hoenlein stated that Pollard should be pardoned on humanitarian grounds, adding that "It's time that he be released. He has expressed remorse." Pollard, who was branded as a traitor in the US but considered a hero in Israel, was released in November 2015, almost thirty years from the day when he was arrested. Pollard was scheduled to speak to members of the Conference in January 2016 in New York. US Representatives Jerrold Nadler and Eliot Engel, to discuss efforts to lighten Pollard's parole conditions, in which both congressmen have been actively involved.

Meeting with Pope Benedict XVI
On February 12, 2009, the conference's leaders met with Pope Benedict XVI in order to re-assert the importance of Jewish–Catholic relations in the wake of the controversy over negationist comments made by Society of St. Pius X bishop Richard Williamson.

See also
American Israel Public Affairs Committee
Anti-Defamation League
Israel lobby in the United States
Jewish Council for Public Affairs

References

External links
 
 List of member organizations

Jewish-American political organizations
Zionist organizations
Zionism in the United States
Non-profit organizations based in New York City
1956 establishments in the United States
Organizations established in 1956
501(c)(4) nonprofit organizations
Israel–United States relations